Grevillea zygoloba is a shrub of the genus Grevillea native to an area in the Wheatbelt and Goldfields-Esperance regions of Western Australia.

Description
It blooms between September and November and produces an axillary or terminal raceme irregular inflorescence with white or cream flowers with white styles.

Taxonomy
The species was first described in 1994 by the botanists P.M. Olde and N.R. Marriott as a part of the work New names and combinations in Grevillea (Proteaceae: Grevilleoideae) as published in The Grevillea Book.

Distribution
It has as limited distribution mostly in an area to the north west of Kalgoorlie but also near Yilgran, Perenjori and Coorow. It is often situated on and among ironstone hills growing in stony and loamy soils.

See also
 List of Grevillea species

References

zygoloba
Proteales of Australia
Eudicots of Western Australia
Plants described in 1994